

Ubu

Ultimon

Ultivac

Ultra Boy

Ultra the Multi-Alien

Ultraa

Ultra-Humanite

Ultra-Man

Ultraman

Umbaluru

Umbrax

Uncle Marvel

Uncle Sam

Undertow

Unity Kinkaid

Universo

Unknown Soldier

Uranium

Usil

 DC Comics characters: U, List of